Alfred John Weston (December 11, 1905 – November 13, 1997) was a professional baseball player with the Boston Braves and quarterback of the Boston College football team.

Baseball
After graduating from Boston College in June 1929, Weston signed as a free agent with the Boston Braves. He made his major league debut on July 7, 1929. He would only play in three games over two days, going 0 for 3 in three pinch hitting appearances, striking out twice. He played the rest of the 1929 and 1930 seasons with the Providence Grays. He hit .235/~.305/.315 in 62 games for them in 1929 and fielded .981 at first base. In 1930, he batted .322 with 7 HR and 60 RBI. In 1931 his contract was sold to the Richmond Byrds, but he did not report.

In 1931, he played summer baseball for Orleans in the Cape Cod Baseball League. He was back in the league in 1933 playing first base for the Provincetown team in its only season in the league.

Football
Weston was an All-America football player known for being a fine running quarterback. He was the starting quartback on the undefeated 1928 Eagle team that won the Eastern Football Championship. He was inducted into the Boston College Varsity Club Athletic Hall of Fame in 1970. He held the BC single season record for touchdowns (12) from 1926–1973.

References

External links

1905 births
1997 deaths
Boston Braves players
Boston College Eagles baseball players
Boston College Eagles football players
Cape Cod Baseball League players (pre-modern era)
Orleans Firebirds players
Providence Grays (minor league) players
Sportspeople from Lynn, Massachusetts
Baseball players from Massachusetts
Players of American football from Massachusetts